The Bharatiya Mazdoor Sangh (translation: Indian Workers' Union)  is a trade union in India. It was founded by Dattopant Thengadi on 23 July 1955.

The BMS itself claims to have more than 10 million members. According to provisional statistics from the Ministry of Labour, the BMS had a membership of 6,215,797 in 2002. The BMS is not affiliated to any International Trade Union Confederation. It is the labour wing of the Rashtriya Swayamsevak Sangh and forms part of the Sangh Parivar.

BMS protested against the anti-labour policies of the Narasimha Rao Government of the Congress, leftists supported Deve Gowda Government and Gujral Government. During the tenure of the NDA Government also which had “friends” of BMS in it, BMS had to oppose the anti-labour policies. Now in Modi Government tenure, called for nationwide movement on 10 June 2020 to protest privatization in PSUs.

External links
 BMS website
 BTEU BSNL (BMS Affiliated Union website in Telecom Sector)
 BMS records largest increase in membership

References

Trade unions in India
 
Hindu organizations
Trade unions established in 1955
Sangh Parivar
1955 establishments in India